The National Soccer League 1980 season was the fourth season of the National Soccer League in Australia.  The champions were Sydney City SC, their second title after winning the 1977 season (as Eastern Suburbs).

League table

Individual awards

Player of the Year: Jim Hermiston (Brisbane Lions)
U-21 Player of the Year: John Spanos (Sydney City)
Top Scorer(s): Gary Cole (Heidelberg United – 21 goals)
Coach of the Year: John Margeritis (South Melbourne)

References
OzFootball Archives - 1980 NSL Season

National Soccer League (Australia) seasons
1
Aus